Y volveré ("And I'll be back") is a Mexican telenovela produced by Televisa and transmitted by Telesistema Mexicano in 1970.

Cast 
Fanny Cano
Irma Lozano

References

External links 
 

Mexican telenovelas
1970 telenovelas
Televisa telenovelas
Spanish-language telenovelas
1970 Mexican television series debuts
1970 Mexican television series endings